Morum dennisoni is a species of sea snail, a marine gastropod mollusk in the family Harpidae, the harp snails.

Description
Specimens taken by shrimp trawlers along the continental shelf of Northern South America have rich red parietal plates whereas examples taken off West coast Barbados usually have orange parietal plates.
The species has a small vestigial operculum -and a very thin periostracum.

Distribution
Sometimes trapped or dredged alive off West coast BARBADOS, at depths around 100–170 metres.

References

Harpidae
Gastropods described in 1842